Jazz with Jackson is a Canadian music television series which aired on CBC Television from 1953 to 1955.

Premise
Series regulars on this jazz performance programme included Cal Jackson and a big band, hosted by Dick MacDougall.

Scheduling
This half-hour series was broadcast for three seasons as follows:

Note: The first season initially aired on alternate weeks until a weekly schedule began in mid-June 1953, with The March Of Time seen on other Saturdays.

References

External links
 

CBC Television original programming
1950s Canadian music television series
1953 Canadian television series debuts
1955 Canadian television series endings
Black-and-white Canadian television shows